is a fictional character in Capcom's Street Fighter video game series. He made his debut in 1997's Street Fighter III: New Generation and also appeared in the game's two updates, 2nd Impact and  3rd Strike.

Unlike the other boxer character of the series, the villainous Balrog, Dudley is portrayed as a well-mannered English gentleman. In the games, he also has far less lofty motivations than other characters—Dudley's storylines in the games have him recovering his father's antique car (in Street Fighter III and Street Fighter III: 2nd Impact), training for an upcoming boxing competition to be attended by the royal family (in Street Fighter III: Third Strike), or looking for roses to plant in his garden (in Super Street Fighter IV).

Dudley has been well received and has been named as one of the characters players want to see in future Street Fighter installments. As a result, he appeared as a playable character in the Street Fighter IV update Super Street Fighter IV and as downloadable content for Street Fighter X Tekken.

Appearances
Dudley is an upper class heavyweight boxer from Britain with powerful techniques and speed. He seeks perfection both in and out of the ring, always behaving as an impeccable gentleman. He is also the son of an athlete who later became a successful businessman. When his father's business began to fail when he was in college, Dudley was able to recover his losses thanks to his boxing career. In Street Fighter III: 2nd Impact, he fights outside a London pub called the Sherlock Holmes, while Knightsbridge tube station and the Harrods department store can be seen in his 3rd Strike background. When his father's prized Jaguar is purchased from a debtor's auction, Dudley goes after the buyer, a man named Gill. In Street Fighter III: 3rd Strike, Dudley has received the honorary title of "Sir" after making a comeback and winning the championship title, and is invited into a contest that will be held in the presence of the royal family. Now known as Sir Dudlington, he decides to travel the world and improve himself before the day of the match. He is also shown to have a great interest in the gardens of his illustrious country estate, occasionally losing track of time, or getting lost, as shown in his Third Strike ending.

In Super Street Fighter IV, Dudley returns as a playable character and joins the tournament in search of new roses for his garden. He also claims he needs something to get his mind off of his missing car and encounters Balrog who challenges him to a fight. In his ending, he is shown lamenting the fact that he was unable to procure the new roses for his garden. As he does so, Dudley notices a flower bloom and comments on its beauty to his butler, Mr Gotch. He also appears via DLC in Street Fighter X Tekken with his official tag partner, Elena. In a small cameo, Dudley can be seen in the background of the England stage in Capcom vs. SNK 2, reading a newspaper while wearing boxing gloves, and he has another small cameo in Pyron's ending in Capcom Fighting Jam.

Character design
Dudley is a very formal fighter, choosing to fight in very tidy green dress pants with green suspenders worn over a short-sleeved, collared white shirt with ruffles on the chest. He wears a green bowtie and dress shoes. He wears his hair short and smooth with a well-kept mustache, has blue eyes and uses blue boxing gloves with a gold trim.

Gameplay
Dudley's Cross Counter is a homage to the boxing manga and anime series Ashita no Joe, in which the lead character takes a blow to the face in order to deal an even more powerful blow to the enemy's face. His "Machine Gun Blow" is also similar to the particular style of drawing multiple rapid-fire jabs in Hajime No Ippo. His corkscrew blow pays homage to Kid McCoy, and finally, his "Rolling Thunder" Super Art is simply an extended, sped up Dempsey roll. Dudley is a "command motion" character, as opposed to a charge motion character like preceding Street Fighter boxing character Balrog, although in his appearances in Super Street Fighter IV and onward, he is given a new attack which requires a charge motion to execute. Dudley's "Jet Uppercut" is a mimicry of Ansatsuken fighters' (Ken and Ryu) Shoryuken, but differs in that Dudley turns quickly after striking the opponent, and rises higher with less horizontal range, and such it is not as suitable to anti-air purposes.

Reception
Dudley has had a mostly positive reception. In 2010, The Guardian ranked him the high fourth place on the list of top Street Fighter characters according to Ryan Hart, the UK's top SF player. Dudley placed #25 on IGN's list of top 25 favourite Street Fighter characters in 2008; quoting Pierce Egan's statement on the cultural role of boxing in British culture, D.F. Smith praised the character's "sheer simple class" and unusual background motivation involving his antique car. UGO.com included him amongst the top 50 most popular Street Fighter characters. Dudley has often been compared with his boxing counterpart Balrog, Edge stated however Balrog "seems a little useless" in light of him. Electronic Gaming Monthly likewise commented that "gamers will be inclined to think he is another Balrog or Mike, but he is far easier to use effectively." Askmen.com named Dudley as of the five characters they wished to be included in Super Street Fighter IV. 1UP.com listed Dudley as one of the characters they wanted to see in Street Fighter X Tekken, stating "With Street Fighter X Tekken'''s combo system seemingly centered on chain combos, Dudley would be a perfect". Heavy.com included him as of the characters they wanted to see in Super Street Fighter IV. Complex ranked Dudley as the fifth most stylish video game character in 2011 and as the 35th "most dominant fighting game character" in 2012. GamesRadar listed Dudley and Steve Fox as one of the matchups they wanted to see in Street Fighter X Tekken. GamesRadar also listed his "Jet Upper" move, "Rocket Upper" super combo and "Rolling Thunder" ultra combo as some of the most satisfying uppercuts in gaming.; on the other hand, GamesRadar also included him among the worst Street Fighter characters ever, commenting that he perpetuates "the harmful stereotype that British people love antique cars." Dudley is ranked 14th in a worldwide Street Fighter'' character poll held between 2017 and 2018.

References

External links
 Dudley - The Street Fighter Wiki

Black characters in video games
Fictional Black British people
Fictional British people in video games
Fictional professional boxers
Fictional socialites
Male characters in video games
Street Fighter characters
Video game characters introduced in 1997
Nobility characters in video games
Fictional boxers